Borno may refer to:

Places

Italy 
 Borno, Lombardy, a municipality in the Province of Brescia

Africa 
 Borno State, Nigeria
 Borno Emirate, a traditional Nigerian state formed at the start of the 20th century
 Bornu Empire, a state which existed from 1380 to 1893 in what is now northeastern Nigeria 
 Kanem–Bornu Empire, a former empire in modern Chad and Nigeria
 Borno, Chad, a canton of the department of Dababa, Chad

People 
 Davor Borno, Croatian musician, pop singer and songwriter
 Ashimi of Borno (c. 1840–1893), Shehu of Borno from ca.1885 to 1893
 Kyari of Borno (died 1894), Shehu of Borno in 1893–1894
 Louis Borno (1865–1942), Haitian politician who served as President of Haiti from 1922 to 1930
 Maurice Borno (1917–1955), Haitian painter
 Umar of Borno (died 1881), Shehu (Sheik) of the Kanem-Bornu Empire
 Trygve Bornø (born 1942). Norwegian international footballer

Other uses 
 Borno people, on the list of ethnic groups in Chad
 Borno Youth Movement, a Nigerian political party founded in 1954

See also 
 Borneo (disambiguation)